The Changes of Life is an album by pianist Jaki Byard, with bassist Ralph Hamperian, and drummer Richard Allen.

Recording and music
The album was recorded in January 1996. Most of the tracks are ballads. Byard's "Family Suite" composition was previously recorded for the album Family Man.

Release
The Japanese label Meldac released the album on CD.

Track listing
"September Song" – 5:15 	
"Solitude" – 5:14 
"The Changes of Life" – 4:09 
"All Alone" – 7:30 	
"Mandella" – 1:40 
"Giant Steps" – 4:02 
"Left Alone" – 5:01 
"Family Suite" – 13:26
"Stardust" – 5:56

Personnel
Jaki Byard – piano
Ralph Hamperian – bass
Richard Allen – drums

References

1996 albums
Jaki Byard albums